Georg Zeumer (7 March 1890 – 17 June 1917) was a German World War I fighter pilot known primarily as the man who taught the Red Baron to fly. Zeumer served in the famed Jasta Boelcke (Jasta 2), which produced a number of German World War I aces. He shot down four confirmed planes before dying in combat in 1917.

Early life
Georg Zeumer was born in Mikołów, Poland, on 7 March 1890, to a family of factory owners.

Military service
Zeumer reportedly already had a pilot's license when World War I broke out in mid-1914. He joined the German flying service in August, and served with Feldflieger Abteilung 4 (Field Flyer Detachment 4, or FFA 4). By November 1914, he had been awarded the Iron Cross and the Knight's Cross of the Military Order of St. Henry. At some point he also received an Ehrenbecher, or "honor cup", one of many engraved silver goblets given as awards to German airmen.

From May to August 1915, Zeumer flew on the Eastern Front with Feldflieger Abteilung 69 (FFA 69), where he befriended Manfred von Richthofen, better known as the Red Baron. Richthofen, then an observer with no victories to his credit, would go on to become the highest-scoring ace of World War I. Zeumer was Richthofen's first pilot, and in August 1915, the two men flew a Gotha G.I in Ostend, Belgium, as part of the Brieftauben-Ableitung-Ostende (BAO) unit. Zeumer was with Richthofen during the latter's first aerial combat, in which they tried unsuccessfully to down an Allied reconnaissance place. Richthofen wrote of the experience: 

Despite this spat, Richthofen and Zeumer had a close relationship, with Richthofen referring to Zeumer as "my good friend" and writing that Zeumer "flew with rare skill." When Richthofen decided to move from being an observer to a pilot, it was Zeumer who taught him how to fly.

In early 1916, both men served with bombing unit Kampfgeschwader 2. Zeumer achieved four confirmed victories there, the first of which was a French Nieuport Scout over Douaumont on 11 April 1916. In June 1916, Zeumer was shot down by the French. Although only slightly injured by the crash, he broke his right thigh in a car accident while being transported out, under what Richthofen described as "quite stupid circumstances."

At some point Zeumer was promoted to Oberleutnant, the highest lieutenant officer rank in the German armed forces. In May 1917, he joined Jasta Boelcke, a fighting unit founded by famed German ace Oswald Boelcke.

Personal life
Following the accident that injured his leg in mid-1916, Zeumer developed diabetes. Because his thigh did not heal properly, he was left with one leg nine centimeters shorter than the other, and had to use a walking stick.

Zeumer's comrades nicknamed him "the lunger" because he suffered from tuberculosis, which in those days was fatal. Knowing his days were numbered, Zeumer gained a reputation for being a reckless flier. This attitude earned him the nickname "Black Cat," and he had a black cat insignia painted on his plane.

Death
Oblt. Georg Zeumer was killed on 17 June 1917, while attacking a British R.E.8 two-seater near Honnecourt-sur-Escaut, France. The plane was crewed  by Lt. Douglas and Lt. E. O. Houghton of the 59 Squadron. Houghton's combat report reads: 

Manfred von Richthofen mentioned Zeumer's death in a letter later published in Ein Heldenleben, a 1920 compilation of his autobiography (The Red Fighter Pilot) and related writings. Historian Norman Franks quotes the passage in his book Jasta Boelcke:

References

1890 births
1917 deaths
Aviators killed by being shot down
German military personnel killed in World War I
Luftstreitkräfte personnel
People from Mikołów
People from the Province of Silesia
Recipients of the Iron Cross